George Atkins is the name of:

George Atkins (American football) (1932–2015), American football player
George Atkins (broadcaster) (1917–2009), Canadian broadcaster
George Atkins (cyclist) (born 1991), British cyclist

See also
George Atkinson (disambiguation)